Crazy Boy (born March 30, 1978) is a Mexican professional wrestler who is best known in Lucha Libre. He works for Lucha Libre AAA Worldwide (AAA) in Mexico. Crazy Boy is the first cousin of Super Crazy. A masked wrestler, Crazy Boy's real name is not a matter of public record, as is often the case with masked wrestlers in Mexico where their private lives are kept a secret from the wrestling fans. In addition to being Super Crazy's first cousin, he is uncle of fellow masked wrestlers Dinastía and Eclipse Jr.

Biography

International Wrestling Revolution Group (1997-2006)

Around the turn of the millennium, Crazy Boy worked extensively in Naucalpan, Mexico State, for the then recently created International Wrestling Revolution Group (IWRG). In IWRG he formed a "suicidal" trio with Star Boy and Súper Boy who all used a high flying, high risk wrestling style.

Consejo Mundial De Lucha Libre (2006)

Crazy Boy's stint in CMLL ended in a messy way, with Crazy pulling himself out from an Arena Mexico show (which would have been his first CMLL one there), claiming an injury from a just completed Japanese tour, only to show up as a surprise days later.

Asistencia Asesoria y Adminitracion (2007–Present)

He won the AAA promoted "Campeonato National de Atomico" (4 man tag team championship), along with Juventud Guerrera, Joe Líder and Psicosis II. After Psicosis II's betrayal costing the Mexican Powers' their titles, Extreme Tiger was brought in as a replacement. Tiger has left the group since to join Halloween's new group, as it remains Crazy Boy, Joe Líder, and Juventud Guerrera. Along with Joe Líder and Juventud Guerrera, the group traveled to Japan to compete in Pro Wrestling Noah's TripleSEM, where they were victorious. Crazy Boy and Joe Líder thought still remain AAA World Tag Team Championship.

Joe Líder broke off his connection to Mexican Powers, losing his and Crazy Boy's AAA World Tag Team Championship to the Halloween and Extreme Tiger. After Líder's leave, Crazy Boy, Juventud Guerrera, and Ultimo Gladiador continued as the Mexican Powers, while Líder formed a new group with Psicosis. When Juventud departed, Crazy Boy and Ultimo Gladiador continued to compete as a two-man tag team. Some months after Dr. Wagner, Jr. joined AAA, Ultimo Gladiador became a part of the Wagnermaniacos faction, leaving Crazy Boy on his own.

Crazy Boy returned to AAA in 2013 to reform Mexican Powers with Joe Líder. On June 16 at Triplemanía XXI, the two won a five-way match for the vacant AAA World Tag Team Championship.

Desastre Total Ultraviolento (2004–Present)

In 2004, Crazy Boy founded his own wrestling organization, Desastre Total Ultraviolento. On September 27, 2007, he teamed with El Generico to defeat Zema Ion and Extreme Tiger. On November 16, 2007, Crazy Boy defeated Zema Ion and Extreme Tiger in a three-way Light Tube match.

Championships and accomplishments

Lucha Libre AAA Worldwide
AAA World Tag Team Championship (2 times) – with Joe Líder
Mexican National Atómicos Championship (1 time) – with Juventud Guerrera, Joe Líder and Psicosis II
Xtreme Latin American Wrestling
XLAW Extreme Junior Heavyweight Championship (1 time)
Other titles
NWG Extreme Championship (1 time)

Luchas de Apuestas record

Notes

References

External links
 AAA profile

1978 births
Mexican male professional wrestlers
Living people
Masked wrestlers
Professional wrestlers from Hidalgo (state)
People from Tulancingo
AAA World Tag Team Champions